Hall Township may refer to the following townships in the United States:

 Hall Township, Bureau County, Illinois
 Hall Township, Dubois County, Indiana

See also 
 White Hall Township, Greene County, Illinois